William H. Shaw (William Harry Shaw) was born on July 31, 1948. He is a professor and former Chair of the Philosophy Department at San Jose State University. He is the author of Marx's Theory of History, Business Ethics, 4th ed., Moral Issues in Business, 8th ed. (with Vincent Barry), and Contemporary Ethics: Taking Account of Utilitarianism.

See also
 American philosophy
 Ethics
 Business ethics
 Utilitarianism
 List of American philosophers

External links
 The Nature of Morality by William Shaw

Living people
1948 births
American philosophers
San Jose State University faculty